Ernest Powell Mabwa (born 26 January 1941) is a Ugandan boxer. He competed in the men's welterweight event at the 1964 Summer Olympics. At the 1964 Summer Olympics, he defeated Maurice Frilot and Constantin Niculescu, before losing to Ričardas Tamulis.

References

External links
 

1941 births
Living people
Ugandan male boxers
Olympic boxers of Uganda
Boxers at the 1964 Summer Olympics
Place of birth missing (living people)
Welterweight boxers